A. C. Jones may refer to:

Arlie C. Jones, American football player and coach; played for University of Virginia
A. Clarence Jones, American football player for the University of Georgia

See also
Jones (surname)